Teliana Pereira was the defending champion, but lost in the first round to Lyudmyla Kichenok.

Irina-Camelia Begu won the title, defeating Tímea Babos in the final, 2–6, 6–4, 6–3.

Seeds

Draw

Finals

Top half

Bottom half

Qualifying

Seeds
The top two seeds received a bye into the qualifying competition.

Qualifiers

Lucky losers

Draw

First qualifier

Second qualifier

Third qualifier

Fourth qualifier

Fifth qualifier

Sixth qualifier

References
Main Draw
Qualifying Draw

Brasil Tennis Cup - Women's Singles
2016 Women's Singles